Big Helium Dog is a 1999 comedy film. It is produced by Kevin Smith's View Askew production company and also features the Broken Lizard comedy troupe in starring (Kevin Heffernan) and supporting (Jay Chandrasekhar, Steve Lemme, and Erik Stolhanske) roles.

Story description
A sketch comedy which spoofs its own production: A guy trying to cope with losing his friend is pulled against his will into a lucrative TV deal that later falls through, nonetheless he saves the world from destruction.

Cast
Matt Kawczynski ....  Charlie Osgood
Michael Linstroth ....  Ray Cross
Kevin Smith ....  Director
Kevin Heffernan ....  Phil
Michael Ian Black ....  Martin Huber
Lorene Scafaria ....  Chastity
Pete Capella ....  High School Jock
Jay Chandrasekhar ....  Movie Producer (scenes deleted)
Damien Furey ....  Autograph Seeker
Ralph Lambiase ....  BHD Interviewer
Alyce LaTourelle ....  Law Bitch
Dicky Barrett ....  Mr. Blocko
Steve Lemme ....  Kendrick
Brian Lynch ....  Director's Assistant
Vincent Pereira ....  Cigarette Fairy
Richard Perello ....  Bartender
Brian Quinn ....  Vance
Blanchard Ryan ....  Beautiful Dancer
Erik Stolhanske ....  Father Joeb
Bryan W. Strang ....  Carl Dunlop
Kelli Strang ....  Little Susie
Kris VanCleave ....  Immense Gay Trucker
Bryan Johnson ....  Undercover Jesus
Ming Chen .... Club Patron
Gary Dell'Abate...Lawyer

See also
 Brian Lynch
 List of American films of 1999

External links
 
Cast and Crew interview

1999 comedy films
1999 films
American comedy films
View Askew Productions films
1990s English-language films
1990s American films